Filippo Volandri was the defending champion but decided not to participate.
Thomas Schoorel won the title, defeating Martin Kližan 7–5, 1–6, 6–3 in the final.

Seeds

Draw

Finals

Top half

Bottom half

References
 Main Draw
 Qualifying Draw

Rai Open - Singles
2011 Singles